Craigerne Residential School is in Peebles, Peeblesshire, Scotland.

Craigerne was opened as a residential school for boys with emotional difficulties April 1956. Over the years hundreds of boys went through its doors through the sixties and seventies. In the winter of 1982, the school had a major renovation, with a  new assembly hall-cum-gymnasium, and improved classroom facilities, funded by a grant from the Scottish Education Department. There were at the time 25 students.

School Closure 

Craigerne closed in June 1989 and it would seem was passed to the  Education Department. The school was purchased by a developer in 2004 and  converted into  flats   Replacement  new oak stairs and paneling  to match the original was restored   after extensive  fire damage.

References 

Defunct boarding schools in Scotland